Filip Marčić (born 22 February 1985) is a Croatian retiredfootball defender, who last played for NK Solin Druga HNL.

Club career

Hajduk
Marčić started his career in the youth ranks of Hajduk Split. In 1999, the 14-year-old defender was spotted by Girondins de Bordeaux scouts and invited to join their youth program.

Bordeaux
In France, Marčić played for the U-18 squad, but never forced his way into the first team.

Hajduk
After six years abroad, he agreed to a two-year contract with his former team Hajduk in 2005. He spent two seasons in Split, but failed to impress and was again on the move in the summer of 2007.

Rijeka
During the summer transfer window, Marčić joined rivals HNK Rijeka on a free transfer. He was a first team regular and helped his team to a fourth-place finish in the 12-team division. His displays attracted the interest of Danish side Midtjylland, who agreed to pay 400 000 € to Rijeka for his services.

Midtjylland
At Midtjylland, he was given a four-year contract, but managed only seven appearances over a 16-month span, before being released in November 2009.

Slaven Belupo
In January 2010, Marčić was signed by Croatian team Slaven Belupo to a two-and-a-half-year contract. After playing just one game, incidentally against his former team Hajduk, he was injured and sidelined for the rest of the season. In September 2010, Marčić, already fined by the team for improper behavior on two occasions, was arrested for drunk driving and spent the night in the police station. Marčić's contract was subsequently terminated.

RNK Split
Without a club until the winter transfer period, Marčić then signed for RNK Split on a year and a half long contract, becoming a regular starter in the team that finished third in the league. His subsequent two years long contract was terminated halfway through in the summer of 2013, after he found himself on the sidelines.

Istra 1961
Marčić signed for NK Istra 1961 in late July 2013, but after two months on the sidelines, without a single official game for the team, the contract was terminated.

International career
Marčić was a regular for the Croatia U-19 and U-21 squad and has totaled 25 appearances from 2002 to 2006.

References

External links
 
 FC Midtjylland profile

 sportnet.hr profile 

1985 births
Living people
Footballers from Split, Croatia
Association football fullbacks
Croatian footballers
Croatia youth international footballers
Croatia under-21 international footballers
HNK Hajduk Split players
HNK Rijeka players
FC Midtjylland players
NK Slaven Belupo players
RNK Split players
NK Istra 1961 players
NK Solin players
Croatian Football League players
Danish Superliga players
Croatian expatriate footballers
Expatriate footballers in France
Croatian expatriate sportspeople in France
Expatriate men's footballers in Denmark
Croatian expatriate sportspeople in Denmark